Counterpoint LLC was a publishing company distributed by Perseus Books Group launched in 2007. It was formed from the consolidation of three presses: Perseus' Counterpoint Press, Avalon Publishing Group's Shoemaker & Hoard and the independent Soft Skull Press. The company published books under the Counterpoint Press and Soft Skull Press imprints. Counterpoint also entered into an agreement for the production, marketing and distribution of approximately eight Sierra Club book titles each year. 

Both Wendell Berry and poet Gary Snyder were investors in Counterpoint, with both of their works currently being published by the Counterpoint imprint. Jack Shoemaker, Vice-president and editorial director of Counterpoint, had worked with both authors in other companies for more than thirty years. Counterpoint published some works by Albanian author Ismail Kadare, including A Girl in Exile, The Traitor’s Niche, and The Doll: A Portrait of My Mother.

Counterpoint merged into fellow publisher Catapult in 2016.

Soft Skull Press

Soft Skull Press is an independent book publisher founded by Sander Hicks in 1992, and run by Yuka Igarashi since 2017. In 2007, Richard Nash, who had taken Soft Skull over from Hicks in 2001, sold Soft Skull to Counterpoint, who closed Soft Skull's New York operation in 2010. Counterpoint merged into fellow publisher Catapult in 2016; subsequently, Soft Skull reopened its New York office with Yuka Igarashi as editor-in-chief, and began to reissue backlist books, including The Amputee's Guide to Sex by Jillian Weise and Something Bright, Then Holes by Maggie Nelson and Wayne Koestenbaum's 2004 novel, Moira Orfei in Aigues-Mortes with a new title, Circus, and to acquire and publish new works.

References

Bibliography

External links
 Official website
 Soft Skull Press

Book publishing companies based in Berkeley, California
Publishing companies established in 2007
American companies established in 2007